Hossam Haick (born 1975) is an Arab-Israeli scientist and engineer, and the current dean of undergraduate studies at the Israel Institute of Technology. He is a pioneer known for inventing the Nano Artificial Nose (NA-NOSE) for detection of disease from exhaled
breath, by which he was highlighted as MIT's Innovators under 35; and which is widely used for sniffing out diseases' biomarkers in labs and industries. He has many contributions in multidisciplinary fields such as Nanotechnology, Nanosensors, Volatile Biomarkers, and Molecular Electronics.

Personal life 
Haick was born into an Arab Christian family in Nazareth. He graduated from a Catholic school St. Joseph Seminary & High School at Nazareth.

Academic life
Haick is a Full Professor in the Department of Chemical Engineering and the Russell Berrie Nanotechnology Institute at the Technion and an expert in the field of nanotechnology and non-invasive disease diagnosis. He was born in Nazareth. In 1998, he received his B.Sc. in Chemical Engineering from the Ben-Gurion University, and in 2002, he got his Ph.D. in a direct track from the Technion. He spent two years (2004-2006) as a postdoctoral researcher at the California Institute of Technology-Caltech, after spending two years at the Weizmann Institute of Science (2002-2004).
He went back to the Technion and became an assistant professor in 2006. He is now a full-academic professor in the department of Chemical Engineering and the Russell Berrie Nanotechnology Institute(RBNI), and the director of the Laboratory of Nanomaterials-based Devices(LNBD) at the Technion.

Research

The research interests of Hossam Haick include nano-array devices for screening, diagnosis and monitoring of disease, nanomaterial-based chemical (flexible) sensors, electronic skin, breath analysis, volatile biomarkers, and molecule-based electronic devices.

He adapted novel spectroscopy and spectrometry techniques and carried out in-vivo, in-vitro, and ex-vivo experiments as well as single-cell analysis to gain new understanding about the volatile biomarkers. In his early discoveries, he showed, for the first time ever, that cancer has a unique (volatile) molecular print through exhaled breath samples. Later, his group showed that each disease has its own unique volatile molecular print and, therefore, the presence of one cancer would not screen out others – a prerequisite for developing new generation(s) of biomedical devices for personalized screening, diagnosis, and future screening of various diseases in a noninvasive, inexpensive and portable manner. These results serve as the main milestone towards formal recognition of a new field of biomarkers, so-called volatolomics (the omics of volatile biomarkers).

From basic science to point-of-care reality, Haick's group has developed and patented a new technology termed Artificially Intelligent Nanoarray that allows diagnosis of more than 23 disease states through exhaled breath using a non-invasive, inexpensive, fast method. Such artificially intelligent nanoarray is easily portable and affordable in the developing countries as well as in developed countries. He also found a unique balance of diversity and commonality in the different (functionalized) nanomaterial systems his group fabricated to enable a response that is amenable for analysis mimicking the olfactory system, with successful implementation of analyzer devices from the fabricated nanomaterial-based sensor arrays which have been put to practical evaluation in more than two dozen hospitals worldwide. Such nanoarays were tested for various types of cancers, chronic and acute kidney disease, hepatic disease, pulmonary arterial hypertension and more. His group has been able to discriminate even between sub-categories of a specific disease as well as between volatile organic compounds that are associated with genetic mutations of important disease states (P53, K-RAS, EGFR, and ALK).

His team has also developed and characterized artificially-intelligent systems called "smart patches" that imitate the human skin, in the sense they can simultaneously feel pressure (or touch), humidity, temperature and chemical analytes. These self-healable smart patches can equip computers, robots and smart objects with the sense of touch, enabling them to feel their surroundings. The patented technology has very high tactile resolution and fast readout times that match, and even exceed, human fingertip touch sensation. Such patches require smaller data readout volumes, low power consumption, low operating voltage and can be fabricated using low-cost printed electronic manufacturing processes. These features have opened new technological and business opportunities, such as touch-sensitive robots and medical devices, prosthetic limbs with tactile feedback, as well as, wearable smart patches for sports and rehabilitation.

The technologies developed by his team have led to the production of more than 42 patents and patent applications – exchanging so many collaborations and partnerships between the Technion and international entities. He led the emergence of spin-offs, such as NanoVation-SG Ltd. and FeelIT Ltd.

Achievements and honorary titles
Hossam Haick was elected by the Senate to hold the prestigious "F.M.W Academic Chair" position at the Technion. He has made significant marks through his development of artificially intelligent nanoarray technology to detect diseases in non-invasive manner, which earned him a wide variety of prestigious grants and awards: Marie Curie Excellence Grant, ERC, Bill & Melinda Gates Award, coordinator of FP-7 consortium (LCAOS; 2011-2015), coordinator of a EuroNanoMed consortium (Volgacore; 2014-2017), coordinator of Horizon2020 ICT consortium (SniffPhone; 2015-2019), and many more. The device is named "Na-Nose", also called "E-Nose." He also has several patents and contributions for creating artificial electronic skins used for prosthetics and robotics applications.

He is the recipient of dozens of international honors and recognition for his efforts - more than 72 prizes and awards - including a Knight of the Order of Academic Palms (conferred by the French government) — first established in 1808 by Napoleon Bonaparte; the List of the World's Top 35 Young Scientists; the Bill & Melinda Gates Award; the Innovation and Entrepreneurship Prize in Chemical Engineering; the Humboldt Senior Research Award; the EU's Electronic Components & Systems (ECS) Innovation Award; top 100 innovators in the world (2015-2018); the Michael Bruno award; the Order of the Merit of Tikun Olam title of the Leo Baeck Education Center; the Al-Khwarizmi Decoration for Educational Contribution for Primary Schools; the YMCA Award; the Lion's Club Award; the Tenne Prize for Excellence in the Science of Nanotechnology; Halevy Award for Innovative Applied Engineering, and many others. Besides his recent and past achievements in research, he had excellent achievements as a lecturer, expressed by a wide variety of prizes that he received for (constant) excellence in teaching (top 4%). He is also the recipient of the prestigious Yanai Prize for Academic Excellence, which is given for exceptional and significant contribution in teaching and academic education. He also was appointed to be a board member of the Scientific Reports. As an active innovative scientist and educational developer in his society, he attracted the attentions of the world's billionaires such as Bill Gates and Eric Schmidt, and he's been in collaboration with Bill and Melinda Gates foundation in the diagnostics of diseases arena. Recently, he was granted the title of Changjiang (Yangtze River) professorship, conferred by the ministry of education in China. He holds an Honorary Doctorate (Doctor of Philosophy Honoris Causa) from the University of Haifa.

Established consortia
Haick has founded and led many consortia, including the following:

•	FP-7 consortium (LCAOS; 2011–2015): This consortium includes 4 academic partners, 2 hospitals, and 3 SMEs, which was ended with stand-alone, on-line system for cancer detection that has been put in more 11 hospitals (till now) in several countries.

•	EuroNanoMed consortium (Volgacore; 2014–2017): This consortium includes 5 academic partners, 3 hospitals, and 2 SMEs. Currently, more than 8 European hospitals use the technology developed in this project by Prof. Haick and his team and collaborators for detection of gastric diseases.

•	Horizon2020 ICT consortium (SniffPhone; 2015-2019): This consortium includes 4 academic partners, 2 hospitals, 3 SMEs, and one big company (SIEMENS AG Corporate Technology; Muenchen, Germany). This project was selected recently as one of the MOST influential projects in the world for 2015-2018 several organizations and has received the EU's Innovation Award for 2018.

•	Horizon2020 Health consortium (VOGAS; 2019-2022): This consortium includes 8 academic partners, 4 hospitals and 2 SMEs from both Europe and Latin America, to develop and validate breath analyzer for the detection and classification of gastric diseases.

•	Horizon 2020 ICT consortium (A-Patch; 2019-2022): This consortium includes 3 academic partners, 2 international companies, 2 SMEs, 1 hospital, and 1 non-profit foundation, for the development of ultra-thing sensory patch for the detection of infection disease from skin.

Additionally, Haick has co-led the establishment and operation of an International Associate Centre between his group at the Technion and INSERM999 (Paris, France). Currently he is a co-director of this center.

Education and teaching

Haick's very tight schedule hasn't blocked him from teaching young students and researchers. He has regularly been awarded the Technion's Excellence Award in Teaching (top 4%) as well as the prestigious "Yanai Prize for Academic Excellence." He loves teaching and believes on the idea of mentoring the young. In 2014, he designed and developed the first Massive Open Online Courses (MOOCs) in the Technion, in a title of "Nanotechnology and Nanosensors" and, for the first time in the world, in two languages: Arabic and English (https://www.coursera.org/course/nanosensors). These MOOCs focused on the newly-emerged field of non-invasive diagnosis as well as personalized medicine approaches.

Societal involvement

A few times a week, Haick visits, on a voluntary basis, different places throughout his country (including primary schools, high schools, and non-profit organizations), sharing his own ideas about advances in science and technology, chatting on, especially with the young, the urgent need for advanced education and excellence in science. So far, his voluntary efforts have been appreciated and evidenced by a list of awards and decorations from all over the world

Publications
Since Haick joined Technion in 2006, he and his colleagues have compiled more than 220 publications in top-level journals in the field of nanotechnology, and advanced/applied materials/chemistry. Despite being educated as an engineer, he has published his ideas in leading clinical journals. The advances he pioneered led to the production of ten book chapters in books of leading publishers. His articles have gained > 11,000 citations, 35 articles of his are with >100 citations. Haick has an H-index = 61.

References

External links
Hossam Haick at Google Scholar

Israeli chemical engineers
Academic staff of Technion – Israel Institute of Technology
1975 births
Living people
People from Nazareth
Israeli Arab Christians
Israeli Melkite Greek Catholics
Arab citizens of Israel
Ben-Gurion University of the Negev alumni
California Institute of Technology alumni